1938–39 was the thirty-first occasion on which the Lancashire Cup completion had been held. Wigan won the trophy  by beating Salford by the score of 10-7. The match was played at Station Road, Pendlebury, Salford, (historically in the county of Lancashire). The attendance was 27,940 and receipts were £1,708

Background 
The number of teams entering this year’s competition remained the same at 13 and the same fixture format was retained. There was once again one bye and one “blank” or “dummy” fixture in the first round. The bye in the second round remained.

Competition and results

Round 1  
Involved  6 matches (with one bye and one “blank” fixture) and 13 clubs

Round 2 - quarter finals  
Involved 3 matches (with one bye) and 7 clubs

Round 3 – semi-finals 
Involved 2 matches and 4 clubs

Final

Teams and scorers 

Scoring - Try = three (3) points - Goal = two (2) points - Drop goal = two (2) points

The road to success

See also 
1938–39 Northern Rugby Football League season
Rugby league county cups

References

External links
Saints Heritage Society
1896–97 Northern Rugby Football Union season at wigan.rlfans.com
Hull&Proud Fixtures & Results 1896/1897
Widnes Vikings - One team, one passion Season In Review - 1896–97
The Northern Union at warringtonwolves.org

1938 in English rugby league
RFL Lancashire Cup